Potato Lake is a lake in Hubbard County, in the U.S. state of Minnesota.

Potato Lake was named for a native root eaten by Native Americans.

See also
List of lakes in Minnesota

References

Lakes of Minnesota
Lakes of Hubbard County, Minnesota